Dana Wells (born August 5, 1966) is a retired American football nose tackle.

Professional career
He played in the National Football League in 1989.

College career
Wells played college football at the University of Arizona and won the Morris Trophy two times.

1966 births
Living people
Players of American football from Phoenix, Arizona
Arizona Wildcats football players
Cincinnati Bengals players
American football defensive linemen